An award share is a statistic in baseball, basketball and other sports.  It is usually used as part of a formula to determine if a player will likely be elected to the Hall of Fame in his particular sport. It is calculated by the number of points a player received for a particular award over the total points of all first-place votes.  For example, in the 2000 NBA MVP race, Shaquille O'Neal received every first place vote but one (120 votes at ten points each), and one second place vote (seven points), and therefore his MVP award share for that season is 0.998 (1207/1210 max points). Cumulative award shares for a career are calculated by adding up all the award shares a particular player got throughout his career.

Career leaders

Baseball MVP Award Shares
 Barry Bonds (9.30)
 Stan Musial (6.96)
 Albert Pujols (6.90)
 Ted Williams (6.43)
 Willie Mays (5.94)
 Mike Trout (5.90)
 Mickey Mantle (5.79)
 Hank Aaron (5.45)
 Lou Gehrig (5.45)
 Joe DiMaggio (5.45)

Cy Young Award Winner Shares
 Roger Clemens (7.66)
 Randy Johnson (6.50)
 Greg Maddux (4.92)
 Clayton Kershaw (4.56)
 Steve Carlton (4.29)
 Pedro Martinez (4.26)
 Tom Seaver (3.85)
 Jim Palmer (3.57)
 Roy Halladay (3.50)
 Tom Glavine (3.15)

Basketball MVP Award Shares

 LeBron James (8.813)
 Michael Jordan (8.115)
 Kareem Abdul-Jabbar (6.105)
 Larry Bird (5.612)
 Magic Johnson (5.104)
 Bill Russell (4.748)
 Shaquille O'Neal (4.380)
 Karl Malone (4.296)
 Tim Duncan (4.278)
 Kobe Bryant (4.202)

WNBA MVP Award Shares
 Lisa Leslie, 6.42
 Lauren Jackson, 4.61
 Sheryl Swoopes, 4.21
 Tamika Catchings, 3.40
 Cynthia Cooper, 2.98
 Diana Taurasi, 2.61
 Yolanda Griffith, 2.34
 Becky Hammon, 1.30
 Tina Thompson, 1.27
 Candace Parker, 1.12

References

Baseball statistics
Basketball statistics